Andrew Kazzi is a Lebanon international rugby league footballer who was contracted to the Wests Tigers.

He was selected to represent Lebanon in the 2017 Rugby League World Cup.

References

External links
2017 RLWC profile

Year of birth missing (living people)
Kazzi
Rugby league second-rows
Australian rugby league players
Australian people of Lebanese descent
Wests Tigers NSW Cup players
Living people
Place of birth missing (living people)